Cotton County is a county located in the U.S. state of Oklahoma. As of the 2010 census, the population was 6,193. Its county seat is Walters. When Oklahoma achieved statehood in 1907, the area which is now Cotton County fell within the boundaries of Comanche County. It was split off in 1912, becoming the last county created in Oklahoma; it was named for the county's primary crop.

Cotton County is included in the Lawton, Oklahoma metropolitan area.

History
The eastern part of what is now Cotton County was opened to settlement by non-Native Americans by the 1901 Kiowa-Comanche-Apache Opening, which distributed land by a lottery system. In 1906, the remainder of the present county, then known as the Big Pasture was opened through a sealed bid process. Most of this territory became part of Comanche County at statehood in 1907.

In 1910, residents of the present Cotton County area tried to form a new county, named "Swanson County," but this effort failed in 1911. Another effort in 1912 succeeded. This time, residents elected to split from Comanche County and name the new county "Cotton County," for the primary crop in the region at the time. Randlett, Oklahoma was assigned as a temporary county seat, until a November 4, 1912 election made Walters, Oklahoma the permanent location.

Wheat became more prevalent than, and corn just as prevalent as, cotton as early as 1915. In 1934, corn had dwindled and winter wheat, cotton and oats had become the primary crops.

The county population has generally declined since 1920. In 1920, the population was 16,679. In 1930, it was 15,542. There was a brief increase in the late 1900s, but decline resumed in the 21st century.

Geography

The eastern portion of the county is in the Cross Timbers region. Its creeks and streams drain to the southeast into the Red River, which borders the county on the south.

Major highways

  Interstate 44
  H.E. Bailey Turnpike
  U.S. Highway 70
  U.S. Highway 277
  U.S. Highway 281
  State Highway 5
  State Highway 36
  State Highway 53
  State Highway 65

Adjacent counties
 Comanche County (north)
 Stephens County (northeast)
 Jefferson County (southeast)
 Clay County, Texas (south)
 Wichita County, Texas (southwest)
 Tillman County (west)

Demographics

The county's population has generally declined since it stood at 16,679 in 1920. As of the census of 2000, there were 6,614 people, 2,614 households, and 1,840 families residing in the county.  The population density was 10 people per square mile (4/km2).  There were 3,085 housing units at an average density of 5 per square mile (2/km2).  The racial makeup of the county was 84.70% White, 2.86% Black or African American, 7.42% Native American, 0.12% Asian, 0.03% Pacific Islander, 1.81% from other races, and 3.05% from two or more races.  4.85% of the population were Hispanic or Latino of any race.

There were 2,614 households, out of which 31.30% had children under the age of 18 living with them, 57.60% were married couples living together, 9.70% had a female householder with no husband present, and 29.60% were non-families. 27.30% of all households were made up of individuals, and 14.90% had someone living alone who was 65 years of age or older.  The average household size was 2.46 and the average family size was 3.00.

In the county, the population was spread out, with 25.40% under the age of 18, 7.40% from 18 to 24, 26.70% from 25 to 44, 22.80% from 45 to 64, and 17.80% who were 65 years of age or older.  The median age was 39 years. For every 100 females there were 98.60 males.  For every 100 females age 18 and over, there were 94.60 males.

The median income for a household in the county was $27,210, and the median income for a family was $35,129. Males had a median income of $28,443 versus $19,101 for females. The per capita income for the county was $14,626.  About 13.70% of families and 18.20% of the population were below the poverty line, including 24.40% of those under age 18 and 16.90% of those age 65 or over.

Politics

Economy
The county's economy has long revolved around agriculture, specifically crops such as cotton and wheat and livestock such as cattle and poultry. Beginning in the late 1910s, oil and gas grew as a strong industry, the county had 290 producing wells in 1920, 32 of which were gas. The southern portion of the county had Devol refineries, pumping stations, and pipelines. A large retail outlet, Temple's B & O Cash Store, shipped merchandise nationwide, before being bought by Sears and Roebuck in 1929 and later closed in 1954.

In 1997 the county held 69,988 cattle and ranked eleventh in the state for poultry sold.

Communities

 Ahpeatone
 Cookietown
 Devol
 Emerson Center
 Fivemile Corner
 Hooper
 Hulen
 Randlett
 Taylor
 Temple
 Walters (county seat)

In popular culture

Cotton County is the main setting for the Animal Planet documentary series Hillbilly Handfishin'.

See also
 National Register of Historic Places listings in Cotton County, Oklahoma

References

External links
 Encyclopedia of Oklahoma History and Culture - Cotton County
 Oklahoma Digital Maps: Digital Collections of Oklahoma and Indian Territory

 
1912 establishments in Oklahoma
Populated places established in 1912